21st National Board of Review Awards
December 18, 1949
The 21st National Board of Review Awards were announced on December 18, 1949.

Top Ten Films 
The Bicycle Thief
The Quiet One
Intruder in the Dust
The Heiress
Devil in the Flesh
Quartet
Germany Year Zero
Home of the Brave
A Letter to Three Wives
The Fallen Idol

Winners 
Best Film: The Bicycle Thief
Best Actor: Ralph Richardson (The Heiress, The Fallen Idol)
Best Director: Vittorio De Sica (The Bicycle Thief)
Best Screenplay: Graham Greene (The Fallen Idol)

External links 
National Board of Review of Motion Pictures :: Awards for 1949

1949
1949 film awards
1949 in American cinema